Stura di Lanzo is a  long river in north-western Italy (Piedmont), in the Metropolitan City of Turin. It is formed from several tributaries near Lanzo Torinese. It flows into the river Po in Turin.

Toponymy 

The name Stura has Celtic origin: stur, which means "to fall".

Principali affluenti 
 Rio Bonello,
 Rio Uppia,
 Rio dell'Uia,
 Stura di Viù,
 Tesso,
 Ceronda.

Notes and references

External links

Rivers of Italy
Rivers of the Province of Turin
Rivers of the Alps
Braided rivers in Italy